The 2013 Wellington City mayoral election is part of the New Zealand local elections. On 12 October 2013, elections were held for the Mayor of Wellington plus other local government roles. Wade-Brown was re-elected.

Wellington is one of eight local bodies in New Zealand that uses the Single transferable vote system to elect its Mayor and Councillors. The 2013 local government election will be the first time that the Greater Wellington Regional Council will use STV in it elections, and the first time a regional council has used STV for elections in New Zealand.

Candidates
When nominations closed there were six candidates for the Wellington mayoralty.

 Rob Goulden, an Eastern Ward councillor until 2010, put himself forward for the mayoralty and for the Eastern Ward. He had previously stood for the mayoralty in 2004. He said that he wanted to "tackle council debt". A news item commented that he "will enliven Wellington mayoral race" as "he was voted out in 2010, after years of turbulent relationships with his fellow councillors".

John Morrison – City councillor for the Onslow-Western ward since 1998. The main centre-right candidate to challenge Wade-Brown.
 Karunanidhi Muthu, barrister and entrepreneur, entered the Wellington mayoral race just before nominations closed. A former chairman of the New Zealand National Party Rongotai electorate, and a past Parliamentary candidate for the United Future Party in the 2008 general election.
 Celia Wade-Brown – The incumbent since 2010, she has served as a Southern Ward councillor.
 Jack Yan – Stood for the mayoralty in 2010; in  stood for the Alliance Party as a list candidate.
 Nicola Young – In  stood in the  electorate for the National Party.

Dr Keith Johnson, an economist from Island Bay who ran as a Labour candidate for the Southern Ward in 2010, initially proposed to stand. He subsequently withdrew, saying that There was not much resonance in the concerns I had for debt control and against the rebalancing of rates.

Results
Wade-Brown was re-elected. The following table shows preliminary results for first preference votes, and final results for the last iteration.

Ward results

Candidates were also elected from wards to the Wellington City Council.

References

Mayoral elections in Wellington
Wellington
Politics of the Wellington Region
2010s in Wellington